Sokol Çela (born 17 June 1988) is a retired Albanian football player and current manager of KF Osumi.

Career

Coaching career
After playing for Albanian third division club KF Osumi in 2020, Çela was appointed manager of the club in 2021.

References

1988 births
Living people
People from Kuçovë
Albanian footballers
Association football midfielders
FK Dinamo Tirana players
KS Shkumbini Peqin players
KF Naftëtari Kuçovë players
KF Apolonia Fier players
Albanian football managers